Komárov is a market town in Beroun District in the Central Bohemian Region of the Czech Republic. It has about 2,400 inhabitants.

Administrative parts
The village of Kleštěnice is an administrative part of Komárov.

Geography
It lies on the border between the Brdy Highlands and Hořovice Uplands.

History
The first written mention of Komárov is from 1263, in a deed of the Ostrov Monastery in Davle. Until 1602, it was owned by the Pešík family. The Pešík family developed the processing of iron ore mined in the area. In 1602, Komárov was bought by Jindřich Otta of Los. After his execution in 1621, Komárov was merged with the Hořovice estate and shared its owners, which lasted until 1902.

In 1917, it became a market town. In 1962, the municipality of Kleštěnice was merged with Komárov.

Sights
The main landmark of Komárov is the Komárov Castle. It was built on the site of an old Gothic fortress, from which the cellars and the Gothic portal have been preserved. Today the castle houses the Ironworks and Foundry Museum.

The folk architecture in the historic centre of Kleštěnice is well preserved and is protected by law as a village monument zone.

Notable people
Kateřina of Komárov (15??–1534), serial killer

Gallery

References

External links

Market towns in the Czech Republic
Populated places in the Beroun District